Učak (in older sources Utčak) is a former settlement in the Municipality of Moravče in central Slovenia. It is now part of the village of Zalog pri Moravčah. The area is part of the traditional region of Upper Carniola. The municipality is now included in the Central Slovenia Statistical Region.

Geography
Učak lies in a wooded area north of Zalog pri Moravčah.

History
Učak had a population of six living in one house in 1900. Učak was annexed by Zalog pri Moravčah in 1952, ending its existence as an independent settlement.

References

External links
Učak on Geopedia

Populated places in the Municipality of Moravče
Former settlements in Slovenia